Surgency is a trait aspect of emotional reactivity in which a person tends towards high levels of positive affect. The APA Dictionary of Psychology defines it as "a personality trait marked by cheerfulness, responsiveness, spontaneity, and sociability but at a level below that of extraversion or mania."

In children, surgency is an emotional dimension that is characterized by high levels of activity and positive emotion, impulsivity, and engagement with their environment. It has been linked to the Big Five personality trait of extraversion in children. High surgency in children as identified by parental self-report has been associated with lower levels of effortful control. A 2003 meta-analysis of gender differences in temperament showed a small to moderate gender difference in surgency levels between boys and girls, with boys showing higher levels of surgency and "generally indicating that boys are slightly more active, less shy, and derive more pleasure than girls from high-intensity stimuli."

Thurstone and Thurstone identified surgency by the word "fluency". This concept of fluency is very broad, and includes facility both in speech and in writing. Cattell found that of all of the objective tests developed for assessing temperament, the fluency tests were the most valid for testing surgency. Studman had also come to similar conclusions.

See also 
 Personality psychology
 Positive affectivity
 Negative affectivity
 Temperament

References 

Postmodern theory
Personality traits